Smoke Ring for My Halo is the fourth studio album by American indie rock musician Kurt Vile, released on March 8, 2011 on Matador. A deluxe edition was released in November 2011, including the subsequent EP, So Outta Reach (2011). The album was produced by John Agnello, Kurt Vile and his backing band, the Violators. Regarding the album's lyrical content, Vile stated: "It’s just me and those thoughts you have late at night when nobody is around. It is more a feeling than a statement – a general wandering feeling. It’s kind of a wandering record."

The album was released to critical acclaim upon its release, with Mojo placing the album at No. 12 on its "Top 50 albums of 2011" list, while Uncut placed the album at number 14 and
Pitchfork placed the album at number 16.

Background and recording 
Following the release of Childish Prodigy (2009), Vile and his backing band, the Violators, embarked upon an extensive tour, with Vile stating, "There has been a lot of touring and more growing – more than people might know." The tour was the first to feature the full Violators line-up, with Vile noting, "[It was the] first time the full band could come along. We had kind of a shitty rental van and it was the first time we were all together for that long. At points it was like Lord of the Flies, everyone ready to eat each other up, and then we're suddenly like best friends again. And we still are best friends."

The band subsequently entered the studio with producer John Agnello. Comparing Smoke Ring for Halos sessions to his previous studio album, Vile stated, "With Childish Prodigy, I had made a whole record not knowing where I was going – it was me in my studio, somewhere between lo-fi and, maybe not super, hi-fi. [...] I wanted to have a concept of this album being a statement as a whole, as opposed a little bit from here and a little bit from there. It shows a kind of introspective folk side more, while still being into rock. It doesn't capture my whole sound, but it captures part of my sound and is more concise as a record."

During the album's initial recording sessions, Vile attempted to record "kind of trance-like, Appalachian folk-style songs [...] and at the time it was too rushed, and I still hadn't nailed it. I attempted to get these tunes down, but they aren't ready yet." The final two songs to be recorded for the album were "Society Is My Friend and "Puppet to the Man", with Vile stating: "Matador did say, 'It's great, but there aren't any rockers on it.' So I [went] back in and recorded a couple rockers, which I'm glad I did. "Society Is My Friend" and "Puppet to the Man" – I recorded them at the end."

Reflecting upon the album in 2013, Vile stated, "I proved myself with Smoke Ring. It was me maturing. I made a good pop record. And all the songs were me, but that was like a growing record. Growing in a lot of ways. But it didn't feel exactly me. I wasn't entirely comfortable or experienced with the scenario, and I feel that [subsequent album, Wakin on a Pretty Daze] is just 100% my voice all the time."

As of January 2012 UK sales stand at 14,000 copies according to The Guardian.

Writing and composition 
Much of the album's material was written on an acoustic guitar, with Vile stating, "I bought a new Martin guitar at the time and I was using at home to get ready to record and it came out real acoustic."

Regarding the religious connotations of the album's second track, "Jesus Fever", Vile stated, "My family was religious – I am not particularly practicing religion myself but I was definitely exposed to it. They were super-religious but not like over-the-top to the point it turns negative. But, it is also kind of a gospel thing – back to old music. The Rolling Stones and Spacemen 3 tap into that religious thing really well, as it is kind of a blues-gospel thing. So, it is a combination of coming from a religious family and that musical lineage."

"Ghost Town" was previously released as "Sad Ghost," a B-side on the single release of "In My Time." The song "Runners-up" contains some of the same lyrics as the song "Red Apples" from the album, God Is Saying This to You... (2009).

Accolades

Track listing

So Outta Reach EP 
A deluxe edition of the album was released including the subsequent EP, So Outta Reach.
 "The Creature"
 "It's Alright"
 "Life's a Beach"
 "Laughing Stock"
 "Downbound Train" (Bruce Springsteen cover)
 "(so outta reach)"

Personnel

Kurt Vile and the Violators 
Kurt Vile – vocals, guitars, sequencer (1), synths (2 and 5), piano (2 and 9), Korg (3 and 10), Mellotron (4), Farfisa (7)
Adam Granduciel – electric guitar (3, 5 and 9), lead acoustic guitar (6), tremolo guitar (10), bass guitar (3), Mellotron (4), percussion (7)
Jesse Trbovich – bass guitar (2 and 9), slide guitar (3), electric guitar (6), vibrato guitar (9), feedback guitar (10)
Mike Zanghi – drums (3 4, 5, 6, 7 and 10), percussion (1, 3, 6 and 9)

Additional musicians 
Mike Polizze – bass guitar (1, 4 and 10)
Lea Cho – ambient keys (1), piano (4), keyboards (10)
Mary Lattimore – harp (4 and 10)
Rob Laakso – Arp 2600 (1)
Meg Baird – backing vocals (1)
Michael Johnson – drums (2)
John Agnello – vibro slaps (6)

Recording personnel 
John Agnello – producer, recording engineer, mixing, overdubs (2 and 7)
Kurt Vile & the Violators – producer
Jeff Zeigler – recording engineer (2 and 7)
Ted Young – assistant engineer
Jonathan Low – assistant engineer
Matt Boynton – mixing (3)
Rob Laakso – mixing (3)
Greg Calbi – mastering

Artwork 
Shawn Brackbill – band photographs
Michael Ast – dumpster photograph

Charts

References 

2011 albums
Kurt Vile albums
Matador Records albums
Albums produced by John Agnello